Heinz Baked Beans are a brand of baked beans produced by the H. J. Heinz Company. They have been sold as "Heinz Beanz" in the United Kingdom since 2008.

History

In 1886, Heinz Baked Beans were first sold at the Fortnum & Mason department store in London. After opening its first overseas office in London in 1896, the company opened its first UK factory in Peckham, south London, in 1905. This was followed by a second factory at Harlesden, north-west London in 1919. Production was started at a former munitions factory at Standish near Wigan in 1946. A new factory opened in Kitt Green, also near Wigan, in 1958.

Between 1941 and 1948, The Ministry of Food classified Heinz Baked Beans as an "essential food" as part of its wartime rationing system.

The Heinz factory in Kitt Green is one of the largest food factories in Europe, and produces more than 1 billion cans of food every year.

Advertising slogan
In 1967, Heinz launched an advertising campaign with the slogan "Beanz Meanz Heinz". The phrase was created by advertising executive Maurice Drake and went on to become one of the best-known advertising slogans in the United Kingdom. Drake later said the slogan was "written over two pints of beer in The Victoria pub in Mornington Crescent". Drake died on 22 August 2021, at the age of 93.

In 1998, Heinz Baked Beans was voted one of 12 brands that citizens of the United Kingdom think best represents the final 10 years of the millennium.
 
In 2008, "Heinz Baked Beans" were renamed "Heinz Beanz", as the original title was "a bit of a mouthful to pronounce", according to the company.

In 2016 Heinz's advertising campaign featuring people using empty beans cans as musical instruments was banned by the Advertising Standards Authority on safety grounds.

BPA allegations
In 2001, the UK's Food Standards Agency found Heinz canned baked beans was one of a number of well-known canned products to be contaminated with the hormone disruptor bisphenol A (BPA). This chemical forms part of the membrane that lines the cans. The Heinz company put out a statement – "Although UK and European food authorities have stated that minute levels of BPA in can coatings are safe, Heinz remains committed to moving to alternatives."

Production method

Heinz Baked Beans are produced by sealing raw haricot beans and tomato sauce in the cans, which are then placed in large pressure cookers. This gives the sauce its thick consistency and ensures a long shelf life for the product.

A standard 415g can will contain an average of 465 beans.

The Beanz Museum
In 2019, Heinz opened the "Beanz Museum" as a pop-up exhibit in Covent Garden London between 30 August and 1 September 2019. The museum contained an interactive and immersive exhibition about the history of Heinz's Baked Beans to mark the product's 150th anniversary .

References

External links

 

Canned food
Heinz brands
Products introduced in 1886
Baked beans